Statistically, this year is considered the end of the whale oil industry and (in replacement) the beginning of the petroleum oil industry.

Events

January–March 
 January 1
 Benito Juárez captures Mexico City.
 The first steam-powered carousel is recorded, in Bolton, England.
 January 2 – Friedrich Wilhelm IV of Prussia dies, and is succeeded by Wilhelm I.
 January 3 – American Civil War: Delaware votes not to secede from the Union.
 January 9 – American Civil War: Mississippi becomes the second state to secede from the Union.
 January 10 – American Civil War: Florida secedes from the Union.
 January 11 – American Civil War: Alabama secedes from the Union.
 January 12 – American Civil War: Major Robert Anderson sends dispatches to Washington.
 January 19 – American Civil War: Georgia secedes from the Union.
 January 21 – American Civil War: Jefferson Davis resigns from the United States Senate.
 January 26 – American Civil War: Louisiana secedes from the Union.
 January 29 – Kansas is admitted as the 34th U.S. state, being admitted as a free state.
 February 1 – American Civil War: Texas secedes from the Union.
 February 4 – American Civil War: In Montgomery, Alabama, the Provisional Confederate States Congress is formed by representatives from the first seven break-away states.
 February 8 – American Civil War: The Confederate States of America are formed, comprising the first seven break-away States.
 February 9 – American Civil War: Jefferson Davis is elected Provisional President of the Confederate States of America, by the Weed Convention at Montgomery, Alabama.
 February 11
 American Civil War: The U.S. House unanimously passes a resolution, guaranteeing non-interference with slavery in any state.
 About 850 convicts at Chatham Dockyard in England take over their prison in a riot.
 February 13 – Italian unification: The Siege of Gaeta,  stronghold of the Neapolitan King Francis II, is ended by Piedmontese forces. Francis goes into exile.
 February 18 – American Civil War: In Montgomery, Alabama, Jefferson Davis is inaugurated as the provisional president of the Confederate States of America.
 February 19 – Alexander II, Czar of Russian Empire, made a law against serfdom.
 February 20 – In Britain, storms damage the Crystal Palace and cause the collapse of the steeple of Chichester Cathedral.
 February 23 – President-elect Abraham Lincoln arrives secretly in Washington, D.C. after an assassination attempt in Baltimore.
 February 24 – Battle of Ky Hoa: the French and the Spanish defeat the Vietnamese.
 February 27 – Russian troops fire upon a crowd in Warsaw protesting Russian rule over Poland, killing 5 protesters.
 February 28 – Colorado is organized as a United States territory.
 March 2
 Nevada is organized as a United States territory.
 American Civil War: Texas is admitted to the Confederate States of America.
 March 3 (February 19 O.S.) – Emancipation reform of 1861: Serfdom is abolished in the Russian Empire.
 March 4
Abraham Lincoln is sworn in as the 16th president of the United States.
 American Civil War: The "Stars and Bars" is adopted as the flag of the Confederate States of America.
 March 10 – El Hadj Umar Tall seizes the city of Ségou, destroying the Bamana Empire of Mali.
 March 11 – American Civil War: The Constitution of the Confederate States of America is adopted.
 March 13 – Tsushima incident: The Russian corvette Posadnik arrives at Tsushima Island in the Korea Strait, Japan, provoking a reaction from the Japanese Shogunate.
 March 17 – Italian unification: The Kingdom of Italy is proclaimed by the new Parliament, with Victor Emmanuel II of Piedmont-Sardinia becoming its king.
 March 19 – The First Taranaki War ends in New Zealand.
 March 20
 An earthquake completely destroys Mendoza, Argentina.
 Italian unification: The surrender of Civitella del Tronto ends the Kingdom of the Two Sicilies.
 March 21 – Alexander Stephens, Vice President of the Confederacy,  gives the infamous Cornerstone Speech in Savannah, Georgia, in which he declares that slavery is the natural condition of blacks, and the foundation of the Confederacy.
 March 28 – Confederate Arizona: convention in present-day Tucson ratified the ordinance of secession of southern part of New Mexico Territory. 
 March 30 – Discovery of the chemical elements: Sir William Crookes announces his discovery of thallium.

April–June 
 April 7 – A population census is taken in the United Kingdom.
 April 12 – The American Civil War begins with the bombardment of Fort Sumter, South Carolina.
 April 13 – American Civil War: Fort Sumter surrenders to Southern forces.
 April 15 – American Civil War: President Abraham Lincoln issues a Proclamation calling for 75,000 men to confront in the South, "combinations too powerful to be suppressed in the ordinary way".
 April 17 – American Civil War: The state of Virginia secedes from the Union.
 April 20 – American Civil War: Robert E. Lee resigns his commission in the United States Army, in order to command the forces of the state of Virginia.
 April 24 (N.S.) – Bezdna, Russia is the scene of a peasant uprising; the military open fire and about 90 are killed.
 April 25 – American Civil War: The Union Army arrives in Washington, D.C.
 April 26 – Giovanni Schiaparelli discovers the asteroid 69 Hesperia.
 April 27 – American Civil War:
 President Abraham Lincoln suspends the writ of habeas corpus in the United States.
 May 6 – American Civil War: Arkansas secedes from the Union.
 May 7 – American Civil War: Tennessee secedes from the Union.
 May 8 – American Civil War: Richmond, Virginia is named the capital of the Confederate States of America.
 May 13
 North Star Affair: The British merchant ship North Star leaves Hong Kong for Nagasaki, Japan.  Chinese pirates board the vessel, kill an officer, and escape with a large quantity of gold.
 American Civil War: Queen Victoria of the United Kingdom issues a "proclamation of neutrality", which recognizes the breakaway states as having belligerent rights.
 Comet C/1861 J1 (the "Great Comet of 1861") is discovered in Australia.
 May 14 – The Canellas meteorite, an 859 gram chondrite type meteorite, strikes Earth near Barcelona, Spain.
 May 20 – American Civil War: 
Kentucky proclaims its neutrality, which lasts until September 3, when Confederate forces enter the state. 
North Carolina secedes from the Union.
 May 21 – Russian sailors clash with a group of Japanese samurai and farmers, at Tsushima island.
 May 23 – American Civil War: The state of Virginia's ordinance of secession from the United States is ratified in a referendum held on May 23, 1861.
 May 29 – The Hong Kong General Chamber of Commerce is established.
 June 9 – The Règlement Organique: With the approval of European powers, the Mount Lebanon Mutasarrifate is established as a semi-autonomous sub-division separate from the Sidon Eyalet. An Ottoman Armenian, Davud Pasha, is appointed Mutasarrıf by the Ottoman Sultan.
 June 15 – Benito Juárez is formally elected President of Mexico; he temporarily stops the payments of foreign debt.
 June 22 – Tooley Street fire starts and takes the life of James Braidwood first director of the London Fire Brigade.
 June 25 – Abdülmecid I, Sultan of the Ottoman Empire (1839–1861) dies and is succeeded by Abdülaziz (1861–1876).

July–September 
 July 1 
 The first issue of the Vatican's newspaper L'Osservatore Romano is published.
 Taiping Rebellion – Battle of Shanghai: French and Imperial Chinese troops defeat Taiping forces.
 July 2 – Ivan Kasatkin lands on Hakodate, and introduces the Eastern Orthodox Church into Japan.
 July 12 – The Confederate States sign a Treaty with Choctaws and Chickasaws in Indian Territory. 
 July 13 – American Civil War: The Battle of Corrick's Ford takes place in western Virginia.
 July 21 – American Civil War: First Battle of Bull Run: At Manassas Junction, Virginia, the first major battle of the war ends in a Confederate victory.
 July 25 – American Civil War: The Crittenden–Johnson Resolution is passed by the U.S. Congress, stating that the war is being fought to preserve the Union, and not to end slavery.
 July 26 – American Civil War: George B. McClellan assumes command of the Army of the Potomac, following the disastrous Union defeat at the First Battle of Bull Run.

 August 1 – The first public weather forecast: measured and predicted correctly by Admiral Robert FitzRoy
 August 5
 American Civil War:  In order to help pay for the war effort, the United States government issues the first income tax as part of the Revenue Act of 1861 (3% of all incomes over US$800; rescinded in 1872).
 The U.S. Army abolishes flogging.
 August 10 – American Civil War: The first major battle west of the Mississippi River, the Battle of Wilson's Creek, is fought, with a Confederate victory.
 August 15 – First description of Archaeopteryx, based on a feather found in Bavaria; in September the first complete identified skeleton is found near Langenaltheim in Germany.
 August 19 – Weisshorn, the fifth highest summit in the Alps, is first ascended.
 August 20–22 – The first modern Welsh National Eisteddfod takes place in Aberdare.
 August 27 – Martin Doyle's is the last execution in Britain for attempted murder.
 September 3 – American Civil War: Confederate General Leonidas Polk invades neutral Kentucky, prompting the state legislature to ask for Union assistance.
 September 6 – American Civil War: Forces under Union General Ulysses S. Grant bloodlessly capture Paducah, Kentucky, which gives the Union control of the mouth of the Tennessee River.
 September 17; Argentine Civil War: Battle of Pavón: Victory of Buenos Aires over the Argentine Confederation, and the re-unification of Argentina.

October–December 
 October 9 – American Civil War: Battle of Santa Rosa Island – Confederate forces are defeated in their effort to take the island.
 October 21 – American Civil War: Battle of Ball's Bluff – Union forces under Colonel Edward Baker are defeated by Confederate troops, in the second major battle of the war. Baker, a close friend of Abraham Lincoln, is also killed in the fighting.
 October 24 – , the world's first ocean-going (all) iron-hulled armored battleship, is completed and commissioned into the British Royal Navy. Western Union completes the first transcontinental telegraph line
 October 25 – The Toronto Stock Exchange is established in Canada.
 October 26 – The Pony Express American transcontinental mail service announces its closure.
 October 28 – American Civil War: The Missouri legislature takes up a bill for Missouri's secession from the Union.
 October 30 – American Civil War: The bill for Missouri's secession from the Union is passed.
 October 31
 The Spanish, French and British governments sign a tripartite agreement to intervene in Mexico, in the hope of recovering unpaid debts.
 The Missouri secession bill is signed by Governor Jackson.
 American Civil War: Citing failing health, 75-year-old Union General Winfield Scott resigns as Commander of the United States Army.
 November 1 – American Civil War: U.S. President Abraham Lincoln appoints George B. McClellan as commander of the Union Army, replacing Winfield Scott.
 November 2 – American Civil War: Western Department Union General John C. Frémont is relieved of command and replaced by David Hunter.
 November 4 – The University of Washington founded.
 November 6 – American Civil War: Jefferson Davis is elected president of the Confederate States of America.
 November 5 – The first Melbourne Cup horse race is held in Melbourne, Australia.
 November 7 – American Civil War – Battle of Belmont: In Belmont, Missouri, Union forces led by General Ulysses S. Grant (in his first combat leadership role) overrun a Confederate camp, but are forced to retreat when Confederate reinforcements arrive.
 November 8 – American Civil War – Trent Affair: The  stops the United Kingdom mail ship Trent, and arrests two Confederate envoys, James Mason and John Slidell, sparking a diplomatic crisis between the U.K. and U.S.
 November 10 – Following the death of Henri Mouhot, his servant Phrai begins shipping his diaries and specimens back to the west; they include accounts of Mouhot's discovery of Angkor Wat.
 November 19 – American Civil War: Battle of Round Mountain in Indian Territory (modern-day Oklahoma). 
 November 21 – American Civil War: Confederate President Jefferson Davis appoints Judah P. Benjamin Secretary of War.
 November 25
A battle commences in the Sundarbans as result of Rahimullah's home being sieged, killing 34 in total
A tenement collapses in the Old Town, Edinburgh (Scotland), killing 35 with 15 survivors.
 November 28 – Acting on the ordinance passed by the Jackson government, the Confederate Congress admits Missouri as the 12th Confederate state.
 December 10
 American Civil War: Kentucky is accepted into the Confederate States of America.
 In southern French Indochina, resistance forces led by Nguyễn Trung Trực ambush, board and sink the French lorcha (boat) L'Esperance on the Nhat Tao canal.
 December 21 - Medal of Honor: Public Resolution 82, containing a provision for a Navy Medal of Valor, is signed into law by President Abraham Lincoln.

Date unknown 
 The British Empire establishes bases in Lagos to stop the slave trade.
 The Perpetual Truce of Peace and Friendship is signed between Bahrain and the United Kingdom.
 The first industrial meat packing plant in Uruguay is established, at Fray Bentos.
 The Royal Seminary becomes the first public institution of higher academic learning open to women in Sweden.

Births

January–June 

 January 5 – Robert Lee Bullard, American general (d. 1947)
 January 6 – Victor Horta, Belgian architect and designer (d. 1947)
 January 10 – Germogen (Maximov), Russian Orthodox Metropolitan (d. 1945)
 January 14 – Mehmed VI, Ottoman Sultan (d. 1926)
 January 27 – Constantin Prezan, Romanian general, Marshal of Romania (d. 1943) 
 January 28
 Julián Felipe, Filipino musician, bandleader (d. 1944) 
 Ramón Meza y Suárez Inclán, Cuban literary critic, historian, professor and author (d. 1911) 
 January 30 – Charles Martin Loeffler, American composer (d. 1935)
 February 12 – Lou Andreas-Salomé, Russian-born author (d. 1937)
 February 15
 Charles Édouard Guillaume, French physicist, Nobel Prize laureate (d. 1938)
 Alfred North Whitehead, English mathematician and philosopher (d. 1947)
 February 17 – Princess Helena of Waldeck and Pyrmont, Duchess of Albany, German-born member of the British royal family (d. 1922)
 February 19 – Henry Horne, 1st Baron Horne, British general (d. 1929)
 February 22
 Mabelle Biggart, American elocutionist (unknown year of death)
 Katō Tomosaburō, Imperial Japanese Navy officer, 12th Prime Minister of Japan (d. 1923)
 February 26 – King Ferdinand I of Bulgaria (d. 1948)
 February 27 – Rudolf Steiner, Austrian philosopher, social reformer and author (d. 1925)
 March 2 – Nikola Ivanov, Bulgarian general (d. 1940)
 March 21 – Charles Swickard, German-American film director (d. 1929)
 April 6 – Stanislas de Guaita, French poet (d. 1897)
 April 8 – Son Byong-hi, Korean independence activist (d. 1922)
 April 15 – Bliss Carman, Canadian poet (d. 1929)
 April 22 – István Tisza, 2-time prime minister of Hungary (d. 1918)
 April 23 – Edmund Allenby, 1st Viscount Allenby, British soldier, administrator (d. 1936)
 April 26 – Rudolf Stöger-Steiner von Steinstätten, Austro-Hungarian general and politician (d. 1921)
 May 5 – Peter Cooper Hewitt, American electrical engineer, inventor (d. 1921)
 May 7 – Rabindranath Tagore, Poet, novelist, dramatist, essayist, story-writer, composer, painter, philosopher, social reformer, educationist, linguist, grammarian, and Nobel Prize in Literature laureate for the collection of poems Gitanjali. (d. 1941)
 May 11 – Frederick Russell Burnham, American scouter (d. 1947)
 May 14 – Harro Magnussen, German sculptor (d. 1908)
 May 16 – Herman Webster Mudgett (alias H. H. Holmes), American serial killer (d. 1896)
 May 24 – Gerald Strickland, 4th prime minister of Malta, 23rd Governor of New South Wales, 15th Governor of Western Australia and 9th Governor of Tasmania (d. 1940)
 June 2 – Helen Herron Taft, First Lady of the United States (d. 1943)
 June 19 – José Rizal, Filipino national hero (d. 1896)
 June 20 – Frederick Gowland Hopkins, English biochemist, recipient of the Nobel Prize in Physiology or Medicine (d. 1947)
 June 22 – Maximilian von Spee, German admiral (d. 1914)
 June 27 – Fanny Davies, Guernesiaise pianist (d. 1934)

July–December 

July 7 – Nettie Stevens, American geneticist credited with the discovery of sex chromosomes (d. 1912)
July 14 – Kate M. Gordon, American suffragette (d. 1932)
July 18 – Kadambini Ganguly, first Indian female doctor (d. 1923)
 August 2 – Edith Cowan, Australian social reformer and politician (d. 1932)
 August 4
Henry Head, English neurologist (d. 1940)
Daniel Edward Howard, 16th president of Liberia (d. 1935)
 August 6 – Edith Roosevelt, First Lady of the United States (d. 1948)
 August 7 – Spencer S. Wood, United States Navy rear admiral (d. 1940)
 August 10 – Almroth Wright, British bacteriologist, immunologist (d. 1947)
 September 2 – Henrietta Crosman, American stage, film actress (d. 1944)
 September 7 – Patriarch Ambrosius of Georgia (d. 1927)
 September 10 – Niels Hansen Jacobsen, Danish sculptor, ceramist (d. 1941)
 September 11
Juhani Aho, Finnish author, journalist (d. 1921)
 September 15
M. Visvesvaraya, Indian Civil Engineer,
Erich von Falkenhayn, German general (d. 1922)
 September 23 
 Robert Bosch, German industrialist, engineer and inventor (d. 1942)
 Mary Elizabeth Coleridge, British poet, novelist (d. 1907)
 September 30
Morgan Robertson, American author (d. 1915)
William Wrigley Jr., American chewing gum industrialist (d. 1932)
 October 4 – Frederic Remington, American cowboy artist, sculptor (d. 1909)
 October 6 – Myra Belle Martin, American financier (unknown year of death)
 October 10 – Fridtjof Nansen, Norwegian explorer, scientist and humanitarian, Nobel Prize laureate (d. 1930)
 October 16 – J. B. Bury, British historian (d. 1927)
 October 24 – Alexey Kaledin, Russian general (d. 1918)
 October 30 – Antoine Bourdelle, French sculptor (d. 1929)
 November 4 – Dimitrios Ioannou, Greek general (d. 1926)
 November 6 – James Naismith, Canadian inventor of basketball (d. 1939)
 November 14 – Frederick Jackson Turner, American historian (d. 1932)
 November 16 – Georgina Febres-Cordero, Venezuelan nun (d. 1925)
 November 23 – Clara H. Hazelrigg, American author, educator and reformer (d. 1937)
November 24 – August Bier, German surgeon (d. 1949)
 December 4
Lillian Russell, American singer, vaudeville star (d. 1922)
Hannes Hafstein, 1st Prime Minister of Iceland (d. 1922)
 December 5 – Armando Diaz, Italian general, Marshal of Italy (d. 1928)
 December 7 – Henri Mathias Berthelot, French general (d. 1931)
 December 8
 Aristide Maillol, French sculptor (d. 1944)
 Georges Méliès, French film director (d. 1938)
 December 15 – Pehr Evind Svinhufvud, Prime Minister and President of Finland (d. 1944)
 December 16 – Antonio de La Gándara, French painter (d. 1917)
 December 20 – Ivana Kobilca, Slovenian painter (d. 1926)
 December 29 – Kurt Hensel, German mathematician (d. 1941)

Date unknown 
 Dixie Haygood, American magician (d. 1915)
 Kallirhoe Parren, founder of the Greek women's movement (d. 1940)
 Victoire Jean-Baptiste, Haitian politician  (d. 1923)
 Abba Jifar II, king of the Gibe Kingdom of Jimma (d. 1932)

Deaths

January–June 

 January 2 – King Frederick William IV of Prussia (b. 1795)
 January 17 – Lola Montez, Irish-born dancer, mistress of King Ludwig I of Bavaria (b. 1821)
 January 19 – Albert Niemann, German chemist (b. 1834)
 February 5 – Pierre Bosquet, French general, Marshal of France (b. 1810)
 February 26 – Wojciech Chrzanowski, Polish general (b. 1793)
 March 10 – Taras Shevchenko, Ukrainian poet (b. 1814)
 March 16 – Princess Victoria, Duchess of Kent and Strathearn, mother of Queen Victoria (b. 1786)
 April 8 – Elisha Otis, American engineer, Founder of Otis (b. 1811)
 April 15 – Isaiah Stillman, U.S. Army Major in the Black Hawk War (b. 1793)
 May 29 – Joachim Lelewel, Polish nationalist historian (b. 1786)
 June 3 – Stephen A. Douglas, American senator from Illinois, Democratic presidential candidate (b. 1813)
 June 6 – Camillo Benso, Count of Cavour, 1st prime minister of Italy (b. 1810)
 June 13 – Richard Lawrence, failed assassin of Andrew Jackson (b. 1800)
 June 25 – Abdülmecid I, Ottoman sultan (b. 1823)
 June 26 – Pavel Jozef Šafárik, Slovak philologist (b. 1795)
 June 29 – Elizabeth Barrett Browning, English poet (b. 1806)

July–December 

 July 22 – Barnard Elliott Bee Jr., Confederate general (b. 1824)
 July 25 – Jonas Furrer, member of the Swiss Federal Council (b. 1805)
 August 10 – Nathaniel Lyon, first Union Army General to die in combat in the American Civil War (b. 1818)
 August 12 – Eliphalet Remington, American gunsmith, founder of Remington Arms (b. 1793)
 August 17 – Alcée Louis la Branche, American politician (b. 1806)
 August 22 – Xianfeng Emperor, 9th emperor of the Qing Dynasty (b. 1831)
 August 24 – Pierre Berthier, French geologist (b. 1782)
 August 28 – William Lyon Mackenzie, Scottish journalist, 1st Mayor of Toronto (b. 1795)
 September 7 – Willie Person Mangum, American politician (b. 1792)
 October 4 – Archibald Montgomerie, 13th Earl of Eglinton, British politician (b. 1812)
 October 5 – Antoni Melchior Fijałkowski, Polish bishop (b. 1778)
 October 10 – Phoebe Hinsdale Brown, American hymnwriter (b. 1783)
 October 26 – Edward "Ned" Kendall, American bandleader, instrumentalist (keyed bugle) (b. 1808)
 October 31 – Guillermo (William) Miller, English-born military leader in Peru (b. 1795)
 November 7 – Isobel Gunn, Scottish business person  (b. 1780)
 November 11 – King Pedro V of Portugal (b. 1837)
 November 13 – Arthur Hugh Clough, English poet (b. 1819)
 November 25 – Rahimullah, Bengali rebel leader
 December 14 – Prince Albert, husband of Queen Victoria (b. 1819)
 December 18 – Ernst Anschütz, German teacher, organist, poet and composer (b. 1780)

References

Further reading
 American Annual Cyclopaedia for 1861 (N.Y.: Appleton's, 1864), an extensive collection of reports on each country in the world and each American state, Congress, and US Civil War; and many other topics